TUFC may refer to:

Telford United F.C.
Thika United F.C.
Tiptree United F.C.
Torquay United F.C. 
Tasburgh United F.C.